Margaret Moffet Law (1871–1958) was an American artist. Her work is included in the collections of the Smithsonian American Art Museum, the Montgomery Museum of Fine Arts and the Gibbes Museum of Art.

References

1871 births
1958 deaths
19th-century American women artists
20th-century American women artists